Mönsterås is a locality and the seat of Mönsterås Municipality, Kalmar County, Sweden, with 6,352 inhabitants in 2012.

Mönsterås is associated with the Swedish poet Carl Boberg, particularly his 1885 writing of the lyrics for the eminent hymn "O Store Gud" (or "How Great Thou Art" by its common English title).

References 

Coastal cities and towns in Sweden
Municipal seats of Kalmar County
Swedish municipal seats
Populated places in Kalmar County
Populated places in Mönsterås Municipality
Port cities and towns of the Baltic Sea